William Hamilton Anderson (1874 – c. 1959) was the superintendent of the New York Anti-Saloon League. He worked toward the prohibition of alcohol and the closing of saloons. In 1924 a jury convicted him of skimming contributions to the league.

Biography
William H. Anderson was born in Carlinville, Illinois in 1874. He received his B.S. from Blackburn College in Carlinville, Illinois in 1892 and an LL.B. from the University of Michigan Law School in 1896. In 1919, he was awarded an honorary LL.D from Illinois Wesleyan.

In 1900, he became an attorney for the Illinois Anti-Saloon League. After only seven years, he and the Anti-Saloon League had closed over one thousand saloons in Baltimore. He was regarded as one of the most skillful politicians and lobbyists in the state of Maryland. He married Clarice Otwell (1872–1947) on October 23, 1901 and they had at least three children. Anderson sought to advance his efforts in New York, recognizing this state as the largest city in the U.S at the time, which harbored great influence over the rest of the nation. In 1906 he became Associate State Superintendent of the Anti-Saloon League of New York, a position he held until 1914.

William H. Anderson wrote a letter on July 24, 1914 and it was published in the New York Times on July 29, 1914:

In 1919, five years after Anderson and the Anti Saloon League had arrived in New York, the Prohibition amendment was passing its way through U.S. legislation. The amendment declared that

the manufacture, sale or transportation of intoxicating liquors within, the importation thereof into, or the exportation thereof from the United States and all territory subject to the jurisdiction thereof for beverage purposes is hereby prohibited.

Suspicions arose of the possibility that Anderson had been using deception to advance the Prohibition movement. Much of his work was actually accomplished through the use of fake documents, false rumors and oral attacks towards his opponents.
On July 3, 1924 he was indicted for forgery of the financial records of the Anti Saloon League. He was sentenced to two years in maximum security prison at Sing Sing.

He died around 1959.

Quote
When prohibition was passed he wrote:

Be a good sport about it. No more falling off the water wagon. Uncle Sam will help you keep your pledge.

Archive
University of Chicago archive

Publications
 The Church in Action Against the Saloon; American Issue Publishing Company (1910)
 Letter to the Editor, New York Times; July 29, 1914; Liquor and the Drug Traffic druglibrary.com
 The Outlook magazine; A Look at What the Prohibition Amendment Might Look Like; December 27, 1916

Timeline
1874 Birth
1892 Graduation from Blackburn College
1900 Attorney for Illinois Anti-Saloon League
1901 Marriage to Clarice Otwell (1872–1947) on October 23
1906 Associate State Superintendent of the Anti-Saloon League of New York
1914 Start as General State Superintendent of the Anti-Saloon League of New York
1919 Honorary LL.D. from Illinois Wesleyan
1924 End as General State Superintendent of the Anti-Saloon League of New York
1924 Indictment for forgery on July 3
1924 Sing-Sing
1925 Release from prison

References

Further reading
The Reminiscences of William H. Anderson; Transcript of interviews conducted April and May 1950 by W. Link
New York Times; August 30, 1947, Saturday; Mrs. W. H. Anderson.
Time (magazine); November 16, 1925. Nowadays the country is facing the "enforcement crisis" and last week the Anti-Saloon League meeting in Chicago called its biennial convention by that name. It was a great meeting. To it came Bishop Thomas Nicholson, President of the League; Francis Scott McBride, General Superintendent; Wayne B. Wheeler, its Washington representative; William H. Anderson, former superintendent of the New York State branch ... 
Time (magazine); July 6, 1925. Last week, William H. Anderson announced the foundation of A. P. P. P. A. (American Prohibition Protestant Patriotic Protective Alliance). What is it? It is an "organization," but it has no members and no charter—not being incorporated. It has no oath. It keeps no books. All its financial transactions are oral. All contributions to it are in the form of "outright personal gifts to William H. Anderson, its founder and general secretary, to be used in any way he sees fit." The object of this strange type of organization is to make the four P's Alliance "persecution proof and uninvestigable." ... 
New York Times; March 26, 1924, Wednesday; Anderson in Prison, Protests Innocence; Submits Grimly to Fingerprinting, Then Is Taken to Sing Sing to Be No. 75,745. William Hamilton Anderson stepped at 2:15 o'clock yesterday afternoon into the main entrance of Sing Sing Prison at Ossining. Two minutes later, as Convict 75,745, he began a sentence of from a year to two years for forgery.
New York Times; April 4, 1918, Thursday; The repudiation of William Jennings Bryan as a "leader" of the prohibition movement in this country is advocated in an article published by William H. Anderson, State Superintendent of the Anti-Saloon League, in this week's, number of the American Issue, the official ...

American temperance activists
University of Michigan Law School alumni
People from Carlinville, Illinois
1874 births
1950s deaths